Vyacheslav Horbanenko (born 22 February 1984) is a former Ukrainian professional footballer.

External links
 
 
 

1984 births
Living people
Ukrainian footballers
Association football midfielders
Ukrainian expatriate footballers
Expatriate footballers in Belarus
FC Kryvbas Kryvyi Rih players
FC Kryvbas-2 Kryvyi Rih players
FC Zirka Kropyvnytskyi players
FC Hoverla Uzhhorod players
FC Torpedo-BelAZ Zhodino players
FC Poltava players
FC Minsk players
PFC Sumy players
FC Belshina Bobruisk players
FC UkrAhroKom Holovkivka players
Sportspeople from Kryvyi Rih